Petropavlovsky (masculine), Petropavlovskaya (feminine), or Petropavlovskoye (neuter) may refer to:
Petropavlovsky District, name of several districts in Russia
Petropavlovsky (crater), a lunar crater
Peter and Paul Fortress (Petropavlovskaya krepost), a fortress in St. Petersburg, Russia
Petropavlovsky (rural locality) (Petropavlovskaya, Petropavlovskoye), name of several rural localities in Russia
Petropavlovskoye, former name of Sabirabad, a city in Azerbaijan